Eucomis grimshawii is a species of flowering plant in the family Asparagaceae, subfamily Scilloideae, native to the Cape Provinces. It was first described by Graham Duncan and Ben Zonneveld in 2010.

Description
The flowering stem (scape) is shaded dark maroon or magenta on the lower half, with similarly coloured marks on the upper half. The ovary has three locules. The seeds are dull blackish brown.

Taxonomy
Eucomis grimshawii was first described in 2010 by Graham Duncan and Ben Zonneveld, and named after J. Grimshaw who first discovered it in 2002, in the southern Drakensberg, south of Lesotho. E. grimshawii is one of the group of smaller summer-growing diploid species of Eucomis.

E. grimshawii most closely resembles Eucomis schijffii, but is shorter, and has greenish white, sweet-scented flowers rather than dark purple flowers with an unpleasant smell, and pale green rather than glaucous leaves. Both species have dull sculptured seeds rather than smooth glossy ones.

Distribution and habitat
It grows in rich soil, on shady, seasonally wet, south-facing grassy slopes and in boggy conditions.

References

External links
 – images

Scilloideae
Flora of the Cape Provinces
Plants described in 2010